The Chola conquest and occupation of Anuradhapura Kingdom was a military invasion of the Kingdom of Anuradhapura by the Chola Empire. It can be seen as an ensuing conflict between Chola and Sinhalese kings after the initial conflict between Chola and the Pandya-Sinhalese alliance during conquest of the Pandya Kingdom by Chola king Paranthka I. After the defeat, Pandya king Rajasimha took his crown and the other regalia and sought refuge in Anuradhapura. The Paranthka made several futile attempts to regain regalia, including invasion of Sri Lanka on a date between 947 and 949 CE during the reign of Sinhalese king Udaya IV (946–954 CE). Therefore, one of the driving motives behind the invasions of Anuradhapura by the Cholas' was their desire to possess these royal treasures. The conquest started with the invasion of the Anuradhapura Kingdom in 993 CE by Rajaraja I when he sent a large Chola army to conquer the kingdom and absorb it into the Chola Empire. Most of the island was subsequently conquered by 1017 CE and incorporated as a province of the vast Chola empire during the reign of his son Rajendra Chola I. The Chola occupation would be overthrown in 1070 CE through a campaign of Sinhalese Resistance led by Prince Kitti, a Sinhalese royal. The Cholas fought many subsequent wars and attempted to reconquer the Sinhalese kingdom as the Sinhalese were allies of their arch-enemies, the Pandyas. The period of Chola entrenchment in northern Sri Lanka lasted in total about three-quarters of a century, from roughly 993 CE (the date of Rajaraja's first invasion) to 1070 CE, when Vijayabahu I recaptured the north and expelled the Chola forces restoring Sinhalese sovereignty.

History

Background

Military expeditions from South Indian forces into Anuradhapura had been brief ad hoc up until the mid-tenth century. These were designed to facilitate short-term gains with minimal involvement followed by a withdrawal to the mainland. However, with the ascension of more ambitious and aggressive imperial Chola kings, Rajaraja I (985–1014) and his son Rajendra I (1012–1044), a new strategy of ruthless plunder and destruction of major political and religious centers on the island occurred, followed by the establishment of semi-permanent and fortified encampments, from where wide-ranging raids could be carried out in other parts of the island.

Fall of Anuradhapura

The tirumagal inscription of Rajaraja I dated to 993 AD first mentions Anuradhapura among the king's conquests. Mahinda V (981–1017) distracted by a revolt of his own Indian mercenary troops fled to the south-eastern province of Rohana. Taking advantage of this internal strife Rajaraja I invaded Anuradhapura sometime in 993 AD and conquered the northern part of the country and incorporated it into his kingdom as a province named "Mummudi-sola-mandalam" after himself. The Culavamsa says that the capital at Anuradhapura was "utterly destroyed in every way by the Chola army. The capital of the conquered Rajarata was moved to Polonnaruwa which was then renamed "Jananathamangalam", a title of Rajaraja. The Chola official Tali Kumaran erected a Shiva temple called Rajarajeshvara ("Lord of Rajaraja") in the town of Mahatittha (modern Mantota, Mannar), which was renamed Rajaraja-pura. Comparing Rajaraja's campaign to the invasion of Lanka by the legendary hero Rama, the Thiruvalangadu Plates states:

A partial consolidation of Chola power in Rajarata had followed the initial season of plunder. With the intention to transform Chola encampments into more permanent military enclaves, Saivite temples were constructed in Polonnaruva and in the emporium of Mahatittha. Taxation was also instituted, especially on merchants and artisans by the Cholas. In 1014 Rajaraja I died and was succeeded by his son Rajendra Chola I, perhaps the most aggressive king of his line. Chola raids were launched southward from Rajarata into Rohana. By his fifth year, Rajendra claimed to have completely conquered the Ceylon and incorporated it into the Chola Empire. As per the Sinhalese chronicle Mahavamsa, the conquest of Anuradhapura was completed in the 36th year of the reign of the Sinhalese monarch Mahinda V, i.e. about 1017–18. But the Cholas never really consolidated their control over southern Sri Lanka, which in the case lacked large and prosperous settlements to tempt long-term Chola occupation. According to the Culavamsa and Karandai plates, Rajendra Chola led a large army into Rohana and captured Mahinda's crown, queen, daughter, a vast amount of wealth, and the king himself whom he took as a prisoner to India, where he eventually died in exile in 1029.

Legacy

The Chola conquest had one permanent result, the kingdom of Anuradhapura, which lasted for over a millennium, was destroyed by the Cholas. Polonnaruwa, a military outpost of the Sinhalese kingdom, was renamed Jananathamangalam, after a title assumed by Rajaraja I, and become the new center of administration for the Cholas. This was because earlier Tamil invaders had only aimed at overlordship of Rajarata in the north, but the Cholas were bent on control of the whole island. When Sinhalese sovereignty was restored under Vijayabahu I, he crowned himself at Anuradhapura but continued to have his capital at Polonnaruwa for it being more central and made the task of controlling the turbulent province of Rohana much easier.

See also
 Sinhalese Revolt (1055 - 1070)
 1215 invasion of Polonnaruwa
 Kalinga Magha
 Pandyan Civil War (1169–1177)
 Anuradhapura invasion of Pandya

Notes

References

Citations

Bibliography

 
 
 
 
 
 
 
 

Polonnaruwa period
Military campaigns involving the Chola Empire
Sri Lankan Tamil history
Overseas empires
1017 establishments
11th-century establishments in Sri Lanka
1077 disestablishments in Asia
11th-century disestablishments in Sri Lanka
States and territories established in the 1010s
States and territories disestablished in the 1070s
Naval battles involving Cholas